George Horace Gooderham (April 18, 1868 – December 22, 1942) was a Canadian businessman and politician. From 1908 to 1919, he was a Conservative member in the Legislative Assembly of Ontario, representing Toronto South and then Toronto Southwest.

Life and career 
Born in Toronto, his father was George Gooderham Sr. (1830–1905), a prominent businessman, and his mother was Harriet Dean. He married Cora Maude Northrop.

He worked in the business founded by his grandfather, William Gooderham, which was the Gooderham & Worts distillery. His brother, Albert Gooderham, also worked in the family business.

Gooderham was Commodore of the Royal Canadian Yacht Club in Toronto and served on the school board for Toronto, serving as chair in 1904. He died on December 22, 1942, at Toronto.

References

Notes

Citations

 Canadian Parliamentary Guide, 1916, EJ Chambers

External links 

G.H. Gooderham House

1868 births
1942 deaths
Progressive Conservative Party of Ontario MPPs
George Horace